BSE Tower may refer to:

 Phiroze Jeejeebhoy Towers, popularly known as BSE Towers which houses the Bombay Stock Exchange
 BSE Tower (Bucharest), which houses the Bucharest Stock Exchange